Nebraska Highway 15 (N-15) is a highway in eastern Nebraska, United States.  It has a southern terminus at the Kansas border south of Fairbury and a northern terminus northeast of Maskell at the South Dakota border.

Route description

Nebraska Highway 15 begins at the Kansas border south of Fairbury.  This southern terminus for NE 15 is also the northern terminus for K-15.  It goes north through farmland towards Fairbury and crosses the Little Blue River.  At Fairbury it crosses U.S. Highway 136.  Near Dorchester it joins with U.S. Highway 6 for about  before splitting off again, and then crossing Interstate 80 south of Seward.  In Seward, it meets U.S. Highway 34.  It continues north and crosses the Platte River just before reaching Schuyler, and then U.S. Highway 30.  It continues north from there where, near Pilger, it travels east for  along with U.S. Highway 275.  Then it heads back north and passes through Wayne before joining U.S. Highway 20 for  near Laurel.  It then splits from US 20, and travels due north until it junctions with Nebraska Highway 12.  It overlaps NE 12 for  past Maskell and then heads back north where it crosses the Missouri River via the Vermillion-Newcastle Bridge into South Dakota and changes to South Dakota Highway 19.

Major intersections

See also

References

External links

 The Nebraska Highways Page: Highways 1 to 30

015
Transportation in Jefferson County, Nebraska
Transportation in Saline County, Nebraska
Transportation in Seward County, Nebraska
Transportation in Butler County, Nebraska
Transportation in Colfax County, Nebraska
Transportation in Stanton County, Nebraska
Transportation in Wayne County, Nebraska
Transportation in Cedar County, Nebraska
Transportation in Dixon County, Nebraska